Jaśnie pan szofer is a 1935 Polish romantic comedy film directed by Michał Waszyński.

Cast
Eugeniusz Bodo ...  Count Karol Boratyński 
Ina Benita ...  Hania Pudłowiczówna 
Antoni Fertner ...  Chairman Pudłowicz 
Tadeusz Olsza ...  Antoni Łypko, the chauffeur 
Stanisława Wysocka ...  Countess Boratyńska
Ludwik Sempoliński ...  Józef Kędziorek, crooked valet 
Wiktor Biegański   
Jan Bonecki   
Feliks Chmurkowski ...  Anatol Szober, banker 
Loda Niemirzanka ...  Kasia, maid 
Józef Redo ...  Waiter 
Zofia Ślaska ...  Nina Szoberowa

References

External links 
 

1935 films
1930s Polish-language films
Polish black-and-white films
Films directed by Michał Waszyński
1935 romantic comedy films
Polish romantic comedy films